Sultan and Shepard (stylized as Sultan + Shepard) are a Canadian electronic music duo who frequently collaborate in record production, songwriting, and remixing.

Biography

Background
Sultan, born Ossama Al Sarraf, lived in Kuwait, Cyprus, and Egypt, before moving to Montreal in 1996 to study mechanical engineering and business at McGill University. While there, he became immersed in Montreal nightlife and the house scene. A series of gigs DJing led to the release of his first track, "Primal Instinct". Sultan was signed to Chug Records in 2001. In 2004, he starred in the documentary Being Osama which detailed his Christian Palestinian roots.

In 2002, Ned Shepard, also a student at McGill DJing in Montreal, gave Sultan a demo CD of music he had been working on. Sultan called Shepard the following morning and expressed an interest in producing together.

Career
In 2008, Sultan + Shepard formed Harem Records to release their music. Their singles include "Walls" featuring Quilla, "No Good" with Fedde Le Grand, "In the Air" with Morgan Page and BT, "When We Were Young" with Dillon Francis, and "Make Things Right" featuring Tegan & Sara. In July 2018 they announced their upcoming debut artist album, slated for release in 2019. They co-wrote and co-produced the 2014 David Guetta song "Bad", co-wrote "Drove Me Wild" by Tegan & Sara from their 2013 album Heartthrob, and have collaborated with Tiësto, Junior Sanchez, The Boxer Rebellion, Vassy, and Nadia Ali.

They were nominated for a 2013 Grammy Award for Best Remixed Recording, Non-Classical for their remix of "Locked Out of Heaven" by Bruno Mars. They were nominated for a 2018 Juno Award for Dance Recording of the Year for their song "Almost Home" featuring Nadia Ali and IRO.

Shepard cites Brian Eno, Underworld, The Chemical Brothers, Faithless, and Sasha & John Digweed among his major inspirations. Sultan cites the same artists as well as Daft Punk and Deep Dish.

Discography

Albums

Extended plays

Singles

Production discography
 Embers, Nadia Ali (2009)
 "Bad", David Guetta & Showtek (2014)

Remixes
All remixes listed have been released on the respective song's official remix EP unless noted otherwise.

References

Electronic dance music duos
House music duos
Canadian house music groups
Living people
Musical groups from Montreal
Record production duos
Remixers
Songwriting teams
Progressive house musicians
Musical groups established in 2002
2002 establishments in Quebec
Year of birth missing (living people)